The crested gallito (Rhinocrypta lanceolata) is a species of suboscine passerine bird in the tapaculo family Rhinocryptidae. It is the only species placed in the genus Rhinocrypta. It is found in Argentina, Bolivia, and Paraguay.

Taxonomy
The crested gallito is the only species in its genus. Two subspecies are recognized, the nominate Rhinocrypta lanceolata lanceolata and R. l. saturata, which was described in 1939. The crested gallito is genetically most closely related to the sandy gallito (Teledromas fuscus).

Description
The male weighs  and the female . It is an unusual tapaculo, having long crown feathers that it often erects as a crest and even bends forward. It also has a long tail that it cocks upward. The nominate subspecies' head is cinnamon with white streaks, its upper parts including wings and tail olive gray. The throat and chest are pale gray, the sides of the breast chestnut, and the lower belly olive gray. R. l. saturata is similar but all of the colors are darker.

Distribution and habitat

The nominate subspecies of crested gallito ranges from northern Argentina through the central part of the country south to northern Río Negro Province and southern Buenos Aires Province. R. l. saturata is found in southeastern Bolivia and western Paraguay.

It frequents thorny brush and undergrowth.

Behavior

Feeding

The crested gallito forages on the ground or through low branches for arthropods.

Breeding

The crested gallito's nest is a ball of grass and other materials lined with hair or wool placed  up in a dense bush or small tree. Up to three eggs are laid, usually between September and December. Both sexes incubate. Shiny cowbirds (Molothrus bonariensis) are known to parasitize the nest.

Vocalization

The crested gallito sings only during the breeding season, with "a loud, resonant, 'chirrup'...at intervals of 2-4 seconds." . The call is "a trilled 'wheer'" .

Status

The IUCN has assessed the crested gallito as of Least Concern. It is overall uncommon but locally fairly common and occurs in several protected areas in Argentina. The population is not known but is believed to be stable.

References

crested gallito
Birds of the Gran Chaco
Birds of Argentina
Birds of Bolivia
Birds of Paraguay
crested gallito
Taxonomy articles created by Polbot